Jennifer Kluska is a Canadian-American film director, screenwriter, and storyboard artist best known for her work on DC Super Hero Girls (2018) and Hotel Transylvania: Transformania (2022).

Career
In 2015, Kluska began her career by serving as a storyboard artist on Hotel Transylvania 2. In 2018, she again served as a story artist for Hotel Transylvania 3: Summer Vacation. In the same year, Kluska directed her first short film #TheLateBatsby, which screened in theaters before the movie Teen Titans Go! To the Movies. The film led to Kluska directing multiple episodes of the television series DC Super Hero Girls, which debuted at the 2018 San Diego Comic-Con. Kluska gained notability when she signed on to co-direct Hotel Transylvania: Transformania, with animator Derek Drymon. In April 2021, she directed the short film Monster Pets, which is part of the Hotel Transylvania franchise. In June 2022, she was hired to direct an upcoming Ghostbusters animated film.

Filmography

References

External links
 

American film directors
American television directors
American women film directors
Living people
Place of birth missing (living people)
Year of birth missing (living people)